Victor Eugène Louis de Stuers (20 October 1843, Maastricht – 21 March 1916, The Hague) was a Dutch art historian, lawyer, civil servant and politician. Widely regarded as the father of historic preservation in the Netherlands, he played a notable part in keeping Girl with a Pearl Earring, by Vermeer, from being sold abroad.

Biography

He was the third son of General Hubert Joseph Jean Lambert de Stuers, and his second wife, Hortense Joséphine Constance, Baroness Beyens (1814-1869). In 1861, he began studying law at the University of Leiden; obtaining his doctorate there in 1869. That same year, he was sworn in as a lawyer at the Supreme Court in The Hague. 

During his time at the University, he had become interested in preserving historical buildings and works of art. In 1873, he published an essay in De Gids, a literary journal, in which he criticized the poor preservation of monuments, government architecture, and museum policy, among other subjects. The following year, a Royal Decree established the "Board of Government Advisors for the Monuments of History and Art", and De Stuers was named Secretary. They provided so many recommendations, the government agencies involved were overwhelmed. 

For its first few years of operation, he served as Provisional Director and purchased the art. Its building was designed by his close friend, Pierre Cuypers. The design was heavily criticized, but received the support of Jan Heemskerk, the Minister of the Interior. Actual construction costs were almost three times the initial estimate, and King William III wrote to him on several occasions, to prohibit certain expenditures on features he disapproved of.

De Stuers was also interested in drawing education. To become more familiar with the subject, he took a seat on the committee for awarding the drawing teacher certifications. Later, he was named its Chairman. He would serve many years there as a board member, and a major donor of art objects.

He served several terms in Parliament, and was involved in the affairs of what were then the Dutch East Indies. In 1907, together with Lodewijk Thomson, he attacked the crimes committed against civilians by Frits van Daalen, during the Aceh War. By 1908, he was suffering from gout, and was forced to deliver many of his speeches while seated.

Victor de Stuersprijs 
The Victor de Stuersprijs has been presented annually since 1987 by the municipality of Maastricht. The award is for architects, their clients or institutions that play an important role in the preservation of the cultural heritage, or the promotion of the urban development or architectural quality, in the city of Maastricht. In even years, the prize is awarded to a new development project and in odd years to a restoration project.

Works
Da capo. Een woord over regeering, kunst en oude monumenten. 's-Gravenhage, Thieme, 1875.
Beknopte beschrijving van de kunstvoorwerpen, tentoongesteld in het Koninklijk kabinet van schilderijen te 's-Gravenhage. 's Gravenhage, 1875.
Het Binnenhof en 's lands gebouwen in de residentie. 's Gravenhage, Van Stockum, 1891.

References

Bibliography 

 J.A.C. Tillema: Victor de Stuers : ideeën van een individualist, Van Gorcum, 1982 

1843 births
1916 deaths
Dutch politicians
Dutch civil servants
19th-century Dutch lawyers
People from Maastricht